Sant'Eugenio Hospital is a hospital located in Rome, Italy. It is one of the largest hospitals in Central Italy. 
The construction of the hospital began in 1933, during the fascist period. The original project, curated by Gaspare Lenzi, Luigi Lenzi and Dagoberto Ortensi,  was inspired by Castel del Monte but planned to develop the building of a plant instead of pentagonal and octagonal erecting five towers at the corners of the rationalist building. The intention would be to occupy the institute of eugenics, of involvement of some scholars involved in the project and the signatories of the manifesto of the race.

References

Hospitals in Rome
Rome Q. XXXII Europa